Becoming is a 2020 American documentary film directed by Nadia Hallgren about the former First Lady of the United States, Michelle Obama. The film was distributed on Netflix and produced by Higher Ground Productions.  The documentary is partly based on her bestselling memoir of the same name, released in 2018. It was released on Netflix on May 6, 2020.

The director of the documentary is Nadira Hallgren. She followed Michelle Obama through her 34-city book tour after Obama's memoir Becoming was published. The documentary features footage of Obama's travels, talk-shows and her work during her tenure as the First Lady.

Reception
The website's critics consensus reads: "It may not get as personal as some viewers might have hoped, but Becoming offers an uplifting look at a pivotal moment in its subject's public life." On Metacritic, the film has a weighted average score of 66 out of 100, based on 18 critics, indicating "generally favorable reviews".

Awards and nominations

References

External links
 

2020 films
2020 documentary films
Netflix original documentary films
Higher Ground Productions films
American documentary films
Films based on memoirs
2020s English-language films
2020s American films
Documentary films about women
Michelle Obama